Vinicius "Vinny" de Magalhães (born July 2, 1984) is a Brazilian mixed martial artist who competes in the Light heavyweight division. A professional competitor since 2006, he was a finalist in The Ultimate Fighter: Team Nogueira vs. Team Mir and has fought five times within two stints with the Ultimate Fighting Championship. He is the former Titan FC Light heavyweight Champion, M-1 Global Light heavyweight Champion and is also a former jiu-jitsu no-gi world champion and ADCC champion. Magalhães also competed in the light heavyweight division of the Professional Fighters League.

Background
Magalhães was born and raised in Rio De Janeiro, Brazil. He played football, beach volleyball and began training in Brazilian jiu-jitsu when he was 14 years old.  His mentors are Royler Gracie & Vini Aieta

Mixed martial arts career

Grappling career
Magalhães was promoted to black belt by his instructors Vinicius Aieta and Royler Gracie, on the podium after winning thirteen matches (ten by submissions), and taking home two gold medals in the 2005 World Jiu-Jitsu Championship as a brown belt. Magalhães has recently expressed that he's been training in different grappling styles such as sambo (primarily leg locks) and catch wrestling. He is also known, despite his background in Brazilian Jiu-Jitsu, as being one of the primary pioneers (along with Shinya Aoki and others) of 10th planet jiu-jitsu techniques in MMA.

In 2007, Magalhães would become the first Jiu-Jitsu No Gi world champion in the Super Heavyweight Division as a black belt.

In 2009, Magalhães had an impressive performance in the most prestigious Grappling Tournament in the World, the ADCC Submission Wrestling World Championship, winning 2 Bronze Medals (Under 99 kg Division and Absolute Division). On his way to win the bronze medal in his weight Division, Magalhães defeated BJJ World Champion Rodrigo Cavaca (1st Round, Inverted Heel Hook),the 2003 ADCC World Champion and 2x BJJ Absolute World Champion Marcio Cruz(Quarter-Finals, Flying Armbar),  ADCC Brazil Trial Winner and Fellow MMA fighter Glover Teixeira (3rd Place Match, Armbar) and Losing a razor edge decision on points to the eventual Champion Xande Ribeiro (Semi-Final, Points). On his run for his second bronze medal, Magalhães beat the 2005 ADCC Absolute World Champion Dean Lister by judges' decision, moving on to the quarterfinals against the 2X NCAA Wrestler and MMA Prospect Chris Weidman, who he beat by Flying Armbar (His second in the Competition), which put him in the Semi-Final against Braulio Estima, who beat Magalhães by points, and became the eventual Absolute Champion. In the 3rd Place match, Magalhães used his experience against Gunnar Nelson to score a Takedown in the last few seconds of the over time to guarantee his second bronze medal in his first ADCC.

In 2011, Magalhães went up weight class in the ADCC Tournament, competing at the 99 kg and over division. He became the divisional winner, beating the reigning champion Fabrício Werdum by points in the final match.

At the 2015 ADCC Tournament, Magalhães won the bronze medal in the 99 kg and over division. All his wins came by submission, including a twister against Rodrigo Artilheiro in the quarterfinals..

The Ultimate Fighter
Magalhães defeated Lance Evans, brother of Rashad Evans, when Evans quit after the first round due to a rib injury. Magalhães then defeated Jules Bruchez by armbar in the first round to move to the semifinals. Magalhães then fought Krzysztof Soszynski and defeated him by armbar in the first round, thus moving on to the finals to face Ryan Bader.

Ultimate Fighting Championship
Magalhães lost via first round TKO in his UFC debut in the finals of The Ultimate Fighter: Team Nogueira vs. Team Mir against former castmate Ryan Bader at The Ultimate Fighter 8 Finale.

Magalhães' next fight was at UFC 97, taking on former The Ultimate Fighter castmate Eliot Marshall. Magalhães lost a unanimous decision (30-27, 30–27, 29-28).

Magalhães was released from the UFC on April 29, 2009 due to his 0–2 record with the company.

M-1 Global
After being released from the UFC, Magalhães went 7–1, winning five fights by submission and two by knockout while dropping one by decision, improving his overall record to 9-5 (1).

Magalhães scored an mounted gogoplata submission victory over Viktor Nemkov to become the M-1 Global Light heavyweight Champion. He then went on to defend the light heavyweight championship with a third-round TKO victory over Mikhail Zayats.

After a contract dispute with M-1 Global, Magalhães placed his belt for sale on eBay.com with a bid of over US$90,000.

Return to UFC
On July 17, 2012 it was announced that Magalhães had re-signed with the UFC.  He faced Igor Pokrajac on September 22, 2012 at UFC 152. and won via armbar at 1:14 of the 2nd round.

Magalhães faced Phil Davis on April 27, 2013 at UFC 159. losing in a unanimous decision.

Magalhães faced Anthony Perosh on August 3, 2013 at UFC 163. He lost by knockout in just fourteen seconds in round 1. After this loss, he was released from the UFC again.

Independent promotions
Magalhães denied any talks of retirement and was expected to fight Jeff Monson in a heavyweight bout on November 9, 2013 at Global Warrior Challenge 2: USA vs Brazil. However, Magalhães pulled out of the fight due to a prolonged back injury.

Magalhães defeated previously unbeaten Mexican fighter Jorge Gonzalez at Xtreme Kombat 24 via first round rear naked choke on July 19, 2014 in Naucalpan de Juárez, Mexico; After almost a full year absence from fighting.

Titan Fighting Championships
Magalhães was expected to take on Jason Brilz in the main event of Titan FC 28. However, he was forced out due to injury and replaced by Raphael Davis.

The championship fight with Brilz was re-booked and took place on September 26, 2014 at Titan FC 30 in Cedar Park, Texas, Magalhães defeated Brilz in the opening minute of the 4th round via guillotine choke after dropping Brilz with a headkick. Magalhães is now the TitanFC light heavyweight champion.

World Series of Fighting
Magalhães was scheduled to face UFC veteran Matt Hamill at WSOF 20 on April 10, 2015. However, he was pulled from the bout after a contract dispute with Titan Fighting Championships.  He eventually faced Hamill at WSOF 24 held on October 17, 2015 and won via submission in the first round.

Magalhães fought for the WSOF light heavyweight championship at WSOF 33 on October 7, 2016 against champion David Branch. He lost via unanimous decision.

Absolute Championship Berkut
Magalhães faced Karol Celinski on July 1, 2017 at ACB 63. He lost the fight via unanimous decision.

Grappling events
On August 9, 2014, Magalhães fought Keenan Cornelius in a grappling match in Metamoris IV.  The fight ended in a draw.  On November 22, 2014, Magalhães again fought at  Metamoris V against Matheus Diniz that also ended in a draw.

Professional Fighters League

2018 PFL season
In his PFL debut, Vinny faced Jamie Abdallah at	PFL 2 on June 21, 2018. He won the bout via first round rear-naked choke.

In his sophomore performance, Vinny faced Brandon Halsey at PFL 5 on August 2, 2018. He won the bout after connecting with a head kick in the first round and finishing Halsey on the ground.

In the quarterfinals on October 13, 2018 at PFL 9, Vinny faced Rakim Cleveland, winning the bout via first round kimura.

In the semifinals on the same night at PFL 9, Vinny faced Bazigit Atajev, winning via first round kimura once again.

In the finals, Vinny faced Sean O'Connell at PFL 11 on December 31, 2018. He lost the back-and-forth fight via TKO between the third and fourth round after Vinny Magalhães stopped the bout.

2019 PFL season
In the first fight of the season, Vinny faced eventual season winner Emiliano Sordi at PFL 3 on June 6, 2019. He lost the bout via TKO in the second round.

In a rematch of the previous season, he faced Rakim Cleveland at PFL 6 on August 8, 2019. He won the bout via first round armbar.

Making it to the quarterfinals, Vinny faced Rashid Yusupov at PFL 9	on October 31, 2019. He lost the bout in the first round after being knocked unconscious.

2021 PFL season
At the beginning of April, Vinny replaced Smealinho Rama for the whole 2021 season. He was scheduled to face Jordan Young at PFL 2 on April 29, 2021. At weigh-ins, Vinny missed weight and had to be taken to the hospital due to complications of his weight cut and was pulled from the bout.

Vinny faced Antônio Carlos Júnior at PFL 5 on June 17, 2021. Halfway through round one, Júnior hit Magalhães with an accidental knee to the groin, rendering him unable to continue. This led to the bout being declared a no contest.

Personal life
Magalhães is married to Alliny Magalhaes, he had a son in November 2010, and a daughter in 2014. Vinny is half-brother of the singer Sidney Magal. He is supporter of the Brazilian club Botafogo.

Championships and accomplishments

Grappling
ADCC Submission Wrestling Championship
2015 Bronze Medal in the 99+ Division
2011 Gold Medal in the 99+ Division
2009 Bronze Medal in the -99 kg Division
2009 Bronze Medal in the Absolute Division
World Jiu-Jitsu Championship (Mundials)
2007 1st place in the "Super Heavyweight" division
2007 3rd place in the "SuperSuper Heavyweight" division
2005 1st place the Absolute division
2005 1st place in the Super Heavyweight division
2003 3rd place in the Absolute division
2002 1st place the Heavyweight division
2001 2nd place in the Absolute division
2000 3rd place in the Middleweight division

Mixed martial arts
M-1 Global
M-1 Global Light heavyweight Championship (One time)
One successful title defense
Titan Fighting Championships
Titan FC Light heavyweight Championship (One time)

Mixed martial arts record 

|-
|NC
|align=center|19–12 (2)
|Antônio Carlos Júnior
|No Contest (accidental knee to groin)
|PFL 5 
|
|align=center|1
|align=center|2:45
|Atlantic City, New Jersey, United States
|
|-
|Loss
|align=center|19–12 (1)
|Rashid Yusupov
|KO (punches)
|PFL 9
|
|align=center| 1
|align=center| 2:46
|Las Vegas, Nevada, United States
|
|-
|Win
|align=center|19–11 (1)
|Rakim Cleveland
|Submission (armbar)
|PFL 6
|
|align=center| 1
|align=center| 1:56
|Atlantic City, New Jersey, United States
|
|-
|Loss
|align=center|18–11 (1)
|Emiliano Sordi
|TKO (punches)
|PFL 3
|
|align=center| 2
|align=center| 2:45
|Uniondale, New York, United States
|
|-
|Loss
|align=center|18–10 (1)
|Sean O'Connell
|TKO (corner stoppage)
|PFL 11
|
|align=center|3
|align=center|5:00
|New York City, New York, United States 
|
|-
|Win
|align=center|18–9 (1)
|Bazigit Atajev
|Submission (kimura)
| rowspan=2 |PFL 9
| rowspan=2 |
| align=center| 1
| align=center| 1:58
| rowspan=2 |Long Beach, California, United States
|
|-
|Win
|align=center|17–9 (1)
|Rakim Cleveland
|Submission (kimura)
| align=center| 1
| align=center| 1:20
|
|-
| Win
| align=center| 16–9 (1)
| Brandon Halsey
| TKO (head kick and punches)
| PFL 5
| 
| align=center| 1
| align=center| 1:34
| Uniondale, New York, United States
| 
|-
| Win
| align=center| 15–9 (1)
| Jamie Abdallah
| Submission (rear-naked choke)
| PFL 2
| 
| align=center| 1
| align=center| 1:37
| Chicago, Illinois, United States
| 
|-
| Loss
| align=center| 14–9 (1)
| Karol Celinski
| Decision (unanimous)
| ACB 63
| 
| align=center| 3
| align=center| 5:00
| Gdańsk, Poland
| 
|-
| Loss
| align=center| 14–8 (1)
| David Branch
| Decision (unanimous)
| WSOF 33
| 
| align=center| 5
| align=center| 5:00
| Kansas City, Missouri, United States
| 
|-
| Win
| align=center| 14–7 (1)
| Jake Heun
| Decision (unanimous)
| WSOF 30
| 
| align=center| 3
| align=center| 5:00
| Las Vegas, Nevada, United States
| 
|-
| Win
| align=center| 13–7 (1)
| Matt Hamill
| Submission (kneebar)
| WSOF 24
| 
| align=center| 1
| align=center| 1:08
| Mashantucket, Connecticut, United States
| 
|-
| Win
| align=center| 12–7 (1)
| Jason Brilz
| Submission (guillotine choke)
| Titan FC 30
| 
| align=center| 4
| align=center| 0:36
| Cedar Park, Texas, United States
| 
|-
| Win
| align=center| 11–7 (1)
| Jorge Gonzalez
| Submission (rear-naked choke)
| Xtreme Kombat 24
| 
| align=center| 1
| align=center| 3:12
| Naucalpan de Juárez, Mexico
| 
|-
| Loss
| align=center| 10–7 (1)
| Anthony Perosh
| KO (punches)
| UFC 163
| 
| align=center| 1
| align=center| 0:14
| Rio de Janeiro, Rio de Janeiro, Brazil
| 
|-
| Loss
| align=center| 10–6 (1)
| Phil Davis
| Decision (unanimous)
| UFC 159
| 
| align=center| 3
| align=center| 5:00
| Newark, New Jersey, United States
| 
|-
| Win
| align=center| 10–5 (1)
| Igor Pokrajac
| Submission (armbar)
| UFC 152
| 
| align=center| 2
| align=center| 1:14
| Toronto, Ontario, Canada
| 
|-
| Win
| align=center| 9–5 (1)
| Mikhail Zayats
| TKO (head kick and punches)
| M-1 Challenge 27: Magalhaes vs. Zayats
| 
| align=center| 3
| align=center| 1:13
| Phoenix, Arizona, United States
| 
|-
| Win
| align=center| 8–5 (1)
| Viktor Nemkov
| Submission (gogoplata neck crank)
| M-1 Challenge 25: Zavurov vs. Enomoto
| 
| align=center| 3
| align=center| 1:40
| St. Petersburg, Leningrad Oblast, Russia
| 
|-
| Win
| align=center| 7–5 (1)
| Jake Doerr
| TKO (punches)
| M-1 Challenge 24: Damkovsky vs. Figueroa
| 
| align=center| 1
| align=center| 1:47
| Norfolk, Virginia, United States
| 
|-
| Win
| align=center| 6–5 (1)
| Robert Scott
| Submission (armbar)
| MMA Xplosion: International Team Challenge
| 
| align=center| 2
| align=center| 3:51
| Las Vegas, Nevada, United States
| 
|-
| Win
| align=center| 5–5 (1)
| Alikhan Magomedov
| Submission (triangle armbar)
| M-1 Challenge 22: Narkun vs. Vasilevsky
| 
| align=center| 2
| align=center| 1:10
| Moscow, Moscow Oblast, Russia
| 
|-
| Loss
| align=center| 4–5 (1)
| Pedro Galiza
| Decision (unanimous)
| Shark Fights 9: Phillips vs Evans
| 
| align=center| 3
| align=center| 5:00
| Amarillo, Texas, United States
| 
|-
| Win
| align=center| 4–4 (1)
| Mike Nickels
| Submission (armbar)
| ROF 36: Demolition
| 
| align=center| 1
| align=center| 1:19
| Denver, Colorado, United States
| 
|-
| Win
| align=center| 3–4 (1)
| Chris Davis
| Submission (triangle choke)
| CFP: The Carolina Crown 2
| 
| align=center| 1
| align=center| 1:13
| Raleigh, North Carolina, United States
| 
|-
| Loss
| align=center| 2–4 (1)
| Eliot Marshall
| Decision (unanimous)
| UFC 97
| 
| align=center| 3
| align=center| 5:00
| Montreal, Quebec, Canada
| 
|-
| Loss
| align=center| 2–3 (1)
| Ryan Bader
| TKO (punches)
| The Ultimate Fighter: Team Nogueira vs Team Mir Finale
| 
| align=center| 1
| align=center| 2:18
| Las Vegas, Nevada, United States
| 
|-
| Loss
| align=center| 2–2 (1)
| Raphael Davis
| Submission (punches)
| Valor Fighting: Fight Night
| 
| align=center| 2
| align=center| 3:03
| Tustin, California, United States
| 
|-
| Win
| align=center| 2–1 (1)
| Luis Ojeda
| Submission (armbar)
| MMAX 18: Going Home
| 
| align=center| 1
| align=center| 0:19
| Tijuana, Mexico
| 
|-
| Win
| align=center| 1–1 (1)
| Adolfo de la Torre
| Submission (armbar)
| MMA Xtreme 15
| 
| align=center| 1
| align=center| 0:21
| Mexico City, Mexico
| 
|-
| Loss
| align=center| 0–1 (1)
| George Bush
| Decision (unanimous)
| GFC: Evolution
| 
| align=center| 3
| align=center| 5:00
| Columbus, Ohio, United States
| 
|-
| NC
| align=center| 0–0 (1)
| Chris Larkin
| No Contest
| Gracie Proving Ground 1
| 
| align=center| N/A
| align=center| N/A
| Columbus, Ohio, United States
| 

|-
|Win
|align=center|3–0
| Krzysztof Soszynski
| Submission (armbar)
| rowspan=3|The Ultimate Fighter: Team Nogueira vs. Team Mir
| (airdate)
|align=center|1
|align=center|3:45
|rowspan=3|Las Vegas, Nevada, United States
|
|-
|Win
|align=center|2–0
| Jules Bruchez
| Submission (armbar)
| (airdate)
|align=center|1
|align=center|3:25
|
|-
|Win
|align=center|1–0
| Lance Evans
| TKO (rib injury)
| (airdate)
|align=center|1
|align=center|0:34
|

See also
 List of current mixed martial arts champions
 List of male mixed martial artists
 List of Brazilian Jiu-Jitsu practitioners

References

External links
 Vinny Magalhaes at PFL
 
 
 Vinny Magalhaes at BJJ Heroes
 Official Myspace

1984 births
Living people
Brazilian male mixed martial artists
Light heavyweight mixed martial artists
Mixed martial artists utilizing Brazilian jiu-jitsu
Mixed martial artists utilizing Muay Thai
Brazilian practitioners of Brazilian jiu-jitsu
People awarded a black belt in Brazilian jiu-jitsu
Brazilian Muay Thai practitioners
Ultimate Fighting Championship male fighters
Sportspeople from Rio de Janeiro (city)
Brazilian emigrants to the United States
World No-Gi Brazilian Jiu-Jitsu Championship medalists